Giorgio Giaretta (born September 6, 1912 in Cittadella) was an Italian professional football player.

1912 births
Year of death missing
Italian footballers
Serie A players
Calcio Padova players
Juventus F.C. players
Association football midfielders